UEV and lactate/malate dehyrogenase domains is a protein that in humans is encoded by the UEVLD gene.

References

Further reading

External links 
 PDBe-KB provides an overview of all the structure information available in the PDB for Human Ubiquitin-conjugating enzyme E2 variant 3